Marco Weber (born 1966, Leer, East Frisia) is a Los Angeles-based German producer and Entrepreneur responsible for a series of high-profile international productions since the mid-1990s. He is also a co-founder of Vrenetic, which he co-founded with Roland Emmerich.

Biography

Early Years 
After a brief spell in a steel factory, Marco Weber earned his spurs in the media industry as production manager for the German version of The Price Is Right before venturing into the production of commercials. He gave his debut as a movie producer with the documentary Annie’s Shooting.

Theatrical production being his main goal, he went to Los Angeles at the age of 25 in order to produce and finance independent movies. One year later he launched his first feature, Don't Do It, with upcoming stars such as Heather Graham and David Arquette. Together with blockbuster director Roland Emmerich (Independence Day) he produced the $20-million sci-fi thriller The Thirteenth Floor directed by Josef Rusnak, starring Vincent D'Onofrio and Armin Mueller-Stahl.

Atlantic Streamline 
In 1998 he founded his company Atlantic Streamline, which was to produce – among others—the heist comedy You're Dead with John Hurt und Rhys Ifans. In 2001 the flop of All the Queen's Men (directed by Stefan Ruzowitzky, who went on to win the 2007 Academy Award for best foreign picture for The Counterfeiters) plunged the firm into major trouble. But one year later Weber was able to celebrate his biggest hit up until this point – the black comedy Igby Goes Down, which earned Golden Globe nominations for its actors Kieran Culkin and Susan Sarandon. Writer-director Burr Steers was honored with an Independent Spirit Award nomination for best screenplay. In the wake of this success Weber closed a first look/cofinancing deal with the studio Metro-Goldwyn-Mayer/United Artists. In 2003, he signed a production deal with MGM/UA.

His 2005 production of Rohtenburg created a stir in Germany at first. The movie was inspired by the true crime case of convicted cannibalistic murderer Armin Meiwes. Upon protest of the offender, who saw his personal rights violated, the Higher Regional Court of Frankfurt prohibited the theatrical release that had been scheduled for March 9, 2006. Three years later this ban was to be overturned by the German Federal Court. Abroad the movie had already made a positive impression. At renowned film festivals like Sitges, Spain, or Puchon, South Korea, Rohtenburg had received awards for best director (Martin Weisz) and best leading actors (Thomas Kretschmann, Thomas Huber) among others.

Senator Entertainment 
In the meantime, Weber, who kept operating from Los Angeles, had become an important player in the German movie industry. End of 2005 he and his partner Helge Sasse together with a group of German-American investors acquired a 50.1 per cent stake in the insolvent long-established distribution company Senator Entertainment AG. Thanks to a target-oriented acquisitions and production strategy Weber was able to give the company a new profile. In 2007 he showed countable success with the Academy Award-nominated Pan's Labyrinth (287,905 admissions – source: German Federal Film Board/GFFB), 1408 (537,334 admissions – source: GFFB) and Quentin Tarantino’s Death Proof (572,906 admissions – source: GFFB). With the newly founded label Autobahn he tried to propagate innovative genre films  – a strategy that worked for low-budget movies like Hard Candy (77,794 admissions – source: GFFB) starring Elliot Page. By the end of 2007 Senator had nearly doubled the results of the previous year with a turnover of €68.37 million.

Concurrently, Weber remained active as producer. As managing director of the American daughter company Senator Entertainment Inc., USA, he realized two high-profile independent movies – the family drama Fireflies in the Garden starring Julia Roberts, Willem Dafoe and Ryan Reynolds as well as the Bret Easton Ellis adaptation The Informers with Mickey Rourke, Kim Basinger and Winona Ryder – both of which were sold worldwide.

In the German market Senator’s movies had a tough time in 2008 – even critically acclaimed productions like The Orphanage (100,371 admissions – source: GFFB) proved a box-office disappointment. Neither did the movies “Autobahn“ series catch on in their theatrical release. It was only in spring 2009 that Weber’s acquisition The Reader starring Kate Winslet, who was to receive an Academy Award as best actress, would provide the distributor with another blockbuster. 2,134,990 admissions (source: GFFB) were equivalent to the most successful movie in the company’s history since 2003.

Return to Core Business 
End of 2008 Weber had already withdrawn from the board of Senator Entertainment AG in order to focus on his core business – movie production. Since then he realized the thriller Unthinkable with Samuel Jackson and served as executive producer of Antoine Fuqua’s crime drama Brooklyn's Finest starring Richard Gere and Ethan Hawke.

Move from Film to Technology 

Following his withdrawal from the board of Senator Entertainment and after his last production Unthinkable, Weber began to move his career-path away from film and towards Technology. Marco identified that large Peer-to-peer file sharing networks like BitTorrent had the potential to monetize on the 150 million users who use the sharing service..

While working with BitTorrent, Weber invented and created a unique and innovative distribution model in collaboration with BitTorrent. With this newly adopted model, BitTorrent users would help finance newly minted “BitTorrent Originals”. As a result of the implementation of this business model, Chinese Cryptocurrency company “Tron”” acquired BitTorrent for US $ 140 million.

Vrenetic and Vresh

In 2016, Weber founded Vrenetic with Roland Emmerich. The two had previously worked together to produce The Thirteenth Floor in 1999, where their engagement with the idea of Virtual Reality had begun. Weber acts as the company's CEO. Vrenetic’s central product, Vresh, is a next-generation, mobile, social media platform for live and on-demand 360-degree video and callin.

Weber and Emmerich saw a gap in the accessibility of VR existing experiences and products, so they set out to make an immersive, social experience for everyone. In late 2017, Weber told a reporter, “We hope this will open up an audience that would not usually use virtual reality or 360 experiences. We have a very intensive publishing kit where you can use filters and animations to play with it in a Snapchat way, and so we hope people just discover it and have fun with it and it’s something that helps roll out virtual reality to a mass audience instead of just people who own a headset. That’s what I wish for the company".

Vresh launched in January 2019 and has since made headways as a rapidly growing 360º Social Media App.

In January 2020 company announced partnership with Beijing Culture Fund and expansion to China market

Personal
Weber lives with his wife, Anne Caroline, and their four children in Malibu, California. Under her maiden name, Caroline Schröder, his wife was one of the stars of popular German TV series Sterne des Südens (“Stars of the South“).

Selected filmography as producer (unless otherwise stated)
 1994: Don't Do It (Executive Producer)
 1995: Red Meat
 1997: No Strings Attached
 1999: The Thirteenth Floor
 1999: You're Dead
 2001: All the Queen's Men
 2002: Igby Goes Down
 2005: Rohtenburg (aka Grimm Love)
 2007: Fireflies in the Garden
 2008: The Informers
 2009: Unthinkable
 2010: Brooklyn's Finest
 2012: California Scheming (Writer, Director, Producer)
 2014: Children of the Machine (Writer, Director, Producer
 2014: Datum (Writer, Director, Producer)

References 

 Blickpunkt Film, 13.5.2004
 Blickpunkt Film, 20.10.2005
 Blickpunkt Film, 15.6.2006
 blond Magazin 7/2006
 Die Welt, 14.9.2006
 Blickpunkt Film, 9.5. 2008
 Blickpunkt Film, 6.8. 2008
 Blickpunkt Film, 26.5.2009
 Anne Thompson, "2009 Sundance a breeze", Variety, January 22, 2009, Ed Meza, "Companies make comebacks", Variety, May 16, 2007

External links

Film people from Lower Saxony
People from Leer
Living people
1966 births